Inai Inai Baa! is a children's TV program broadcast by NHK Educational TV for infants (0–2 years old), consisting of gymnastics, songs, educations, etc.  It started airing on April 1, 1996.

Overview 
NHK's program for infants, which started broadcasting in 1996. The audience rating of NHK education as a children's program is the most popular program, following Okaasan to Issho and Miitsuketa!.

The program name "" has the meaning of "full of energy".

The pilot version was broadcast on BS2 on January 15 and 16, 1996.  Broadcasting began on NHK BS2 Television on April 1, 1996, and then on October 7, 1996, it moved to the current educational television frame. From April 5, 1999, there were two broadcasting systems, morning and evening.

Appearances are regular such as Wanwan, Sister (Haru-chan as of 2019), and Puppet (U-tan as of 2019). Up until now, elementary school girls have been appointed as sisters, and they have been replaced in four years (only the first three years).  The puppets also change irregularly.

As of 2021, localized versions are being produced and broadcast in Shanghai (People's Republic of China), Vietnam and Myanmar.

References

External links 

1996 Japanese television series debuts
NHK original programming
Japanese children's television series
Japanese television series with live action and animation